Ethiopian Review is an Ethiopian news and opinion journal published in English and Amharic.

History
The Ethiopian Review was launched in 1991 by Hailu Indashaw, publisher, and Elias Kifle, editor. In 1995, Elias Kifle became publisher, and Elias Wondimu — owner of Tsehai Publishers — became the editor.

In 2000, Elias Kifle became publisher and editor-in-chief. He also discontinued the print version and turned it into an online journal.

Libel 
Ethiopian Review repeated unwarranted material relating to the Sheikh's family and to matters previously dealt with in the Al Amoudi v. Brisard case of 2005. M. Brisard had made serious and unwarranted allegations concerning engagement in the funding of terrorism in the wake of 9/11 but had subsequently apologised for the accusation. The judge found the statements to be untrue and stated that Al Amoudi "is implacably opposed to terrorism in all its forms”.

In December 2010 Mohammed Hussein Ali Al Amoudi initiated a claim in the English High Court against Elias Kifle claiming damages for libel. In July 2011 Kifle was ordered to pay £175,000 in damages for publishing false information.

References

External links
 Ethiopian Review website 
 U.S. Department of State Human Rights Report on Ethiopia 2008

See also
Addis Fortune
 Jimma Times
 Ethiopian Reporter

Amharic-language newspapers
English-language magazines
Magazines established in 1991
Magazines published in Ethiopia
News magazines published in Africa